Arthur P. Schmidt (August 21, 1912 – July 22, 1965) was an American film editor and producer. He had more than sixty film credits for editing from 1934 through 1962. In the 1950s, Schmidt edited five films directed by Billy Wilder, who has been called one of the great 20th Century filmmakers. In the 1960s, Schmidt was the associate producer for seven Jerry Lewis comedies.

Biography
Schmidt's first editing credits are for films from RKO Pictures, which was one of the major Hollywood studios in the 1930s; his RKO credits include Anne of Green Gables (1934). By 1936 he was working at a second studio, Paramount Pictures, where he remained for twenty years. He worked on several of the Bulldog Drummond B-movies, The Blue Dahlia (1946) and When Worlds Collide (1951). He edited seven films directed by George Marshall, including three comedies starring Bob Hope (Monsieur Beaucaire (1946), Sorrowful Jones (1949), and Off Limits (1953)).

At Paramount, Schmit began his notable collaboration with the director Billy Wilder. With Doane Harrison, he edited Sunset Boulevard (1950), which was nominated for the Academy Award for Best Film Editing. Harrison had been the editor for all of Wilder's films since his first American film as a director, The Major and the Minor (1942); ultimately, the two worked together on films for nearly thirty years.

Schmidt edited Wilder's next film, Ace in the Hole (1951), with Harrison again being credited as "editorial supervisor". Roger Ebert recently commented on this film, "There's not a wasted shot in Wilder's film, which is single-mindedly economical. Students of Arthur Schmidt's editing could learn from the way every shot does its duty. There's not even a gratuitous reaction shot."

Schmidt's third film with Wilder was Sabrina (1954), which was Wilder's last film with Paramount. Harrison's credit had changed to "editorial advisor". By 1957 both Schmidt and Wilder were working independently of Paramount. He edited The Spirit of St. Louis (1957); by then, Harrison was being credited as a producer. Schmidt's editing of The Spirit of St. Louis still attracts critical attention long after the film's release; the film tells the story of Charles Lindbergh's historic, first aircraft crossing of the Atlantic Ocean in 1927.

In 2004, Richard Armstrong wrote, "Lindbergh's takeoff is spellbinding. Like the aircraft, the editing is superbly designed. Editor Arthur Schmidt juggles shots of the runway, the plane, Lindbergh's goggled concentration, the muddying undercarriage, Mahoney, the girl, back to the plane, ... for as long as it takes Lindbergh to clear the telegraph wires and trees. Notice that the shots of the pilot find him visibly connected to the controls. Man and machine have never been more at one. It is an alarming passage, suggesting just how many are being "carried" by that flimsy little aircraft." Gene D. Phillips wrote in 2010 that, "The takeoff in the rain from Roosevelt Field in Long Island is a virtuoso set piece" that is "superbly edited by Schmidt".

In the same year as Spirit of Saint Louis, Schmidt and Philip W. Anderson were nominated for the Academy Award for their editing of Sayonara (1957-directed by Joshua Logan). Schmidt also edited The Old Man and the Sea (1958-directed by John Sturges). Schmidt's fifth and final film with Wilder was Some Like It Hot (1959); Daniel Mandell edited Wilder's Witness for the Prosecution (1957), and subsequently edited Wilder's films through the 1960s.

The final phase of Schmidt's career was working on Jerry Lewis comedy films. He edited Cinderfella (1960) and It's Only Money (1962), which was his last editing credit. He was the associate producer for seven of Lewis' films, from The Errand Boy (1961) through The Family Jewels (1965). Schmidt died suddenly on July 22, 1965, in Los Angeles, California.

One of Schmidt's sons, Arthur R. Schmidt, is also a notable film editor who has won Academy Awards for Who Framed Roger Rabbit (1988) and Forrest Gump (1994).

Selected filmography (editor)
Based on the Internet Movie Database.

See also
List of film director and editor collaborations

References

External links
IMDB - Arthur P. Schmidt - Awards
IMDB - Arthur P. Schmidt - Biography
IMDB - Arthur P. Schmidt - Filmography

1912 births
1965 deaths
Place of birth missing
American film editors